Bruno Sandoval Núñez (born April 15, 1991) is a Mexican professional boxer Sandoval is promoted by current WBC Champion, Mexican Saúl Álvarez' company Canelo Promotions.

Professional career
On November 3, 2012, Sandoval knocked out Eduardo Tercero to win the WBC USNBC Super Middleweight Championship. This bout was held at the Unidad Deportiva "El Chamizal" in Zamora, Michoacán, Mexico.

In April 2013 Bruno was named the prospect of the year by Mexico City's Boxing Commission.

References

External links

Boxers from Mexico City
Middleweight boxers
1991 births
Living people
Mexican male boxers